Lidia Mirchandani (born 26 July 1976) is a Spanish basketball player who last played for Skallagrímur in the Úrvalsdeild kvenna and a former player for the Spain national team.

Club career
After four seasons of retirement, Mirchandani returned to the court on 1 November 2017, at the age of 41, with Skallagrímur in the Icelandic Úrvalsdeild kvenna.

Spain national team
Mirchandani played 34 games for the Spain national team and helped it win bronze at the 2001 EuroBasket.

Personal life
Mirchandani is of Indian descent. She is married to Ricardo González Dávila, the former head coach of North Korea's men's and women's national basketball teams and the Chilean women's national basketball team.

References

External links
Spanish national team profile
Icelandic statistics
Italy statistics
Spanish statistics
FIBA Europe profile

1976 births
Living people
Guards (basketball)
Spanish women's basketball players
Sportspeople from Santa Cruz de Tenerife
Spanish people of Indian descent
Sportspeople of Indian descent
Spanish people of Sindhi descent
Ros Casares Valencia players
Úrvalsdeild kvenna basketball players
Skallagrímur women's basketball players
Skallagrímur women's basketball coaches
Spanish expatriate basketball people
Spanish expatriate basketball people in Italy
Spanish expatriate basketball people in Russia
Spanish expatriate sportspeople in Iceland